Thiago Alves and Franco Ferreiro were the defending champions, however decided not to participate.
Johan Brunström and Frederik Nielsen won the title. They won against Nicolas Mahut and Lovro Zovko 6–2, 3–6, [10–6] in the final.

Seeds

Draw

Draw

References
 Main draw

Doubles
2011